Craig Mann is a Canadian re-recording mixer. He won an Oscar in the category Best Sound Mixing for Whiplash. He has worked on more than 110 films since 1998. Mann was born in Oakville, Ontario and raised in Pickering and Burlington. He graduated from the music engineering program at Fanshawe College in London, Ontario.

Selected filmography
 Whiplash (2014)
 Uttama Villain (2015)

References

External links

Year of birth missing (living people)
Living people
Canadian audio engineers
Best Sound Mixing Academy Award winners
Best Sound BAFTA Award winners
People from Oakville, Ontario
Canadian expatriates in the United States
Fanshawe College alumni
People from Burlington, Ontario
People from Pickering, Ontario